BRT Marrakesh is a bus rapid transit system that is also partly trolleybus in Marrakesh, Morocco. It opened on 29 September 2017. The system is officially known as Bus à Haut Niveau de Service de Marrakech (BHNS de Marrakech), which equates to the English term Bus Rapid Transit, or BRT, of Marrakesh.  Although the buses are equipped to operate as trolleybuses, only part of the system is fitted with overhead wiring for trolleybuses, and the vehicles operated on batteries over the other sections.

The transit system aims at increasing the public transport ridership and providing a tram-like service in a cheap and environmental way. The electricity powering the vehicles comes from solar power.

Lines 
The initial route in operation runs from Bab Doukkala in the city center to Al Massira. It is marked as route A at stops, but trolleybuses in service display only "BRT1" on their destination signs. The vehicles are powered on the other sections solely by their batteries, which are recharged from the overhead trolley wires.

Other lines are expected to start operations by the end of 2019.

Fleet 
The fleet consists of 10 low-floor trolleybuses built by Dongfeng Yangtse, model Veyron G92 or WG6120BEVHR. At the time of the system's opening in September 2017, it was reported that an additional 20 trolleybuses were on order, and that these would be 18-metre articulated units.

References

External links 

 Official presentation on the Marrakech town hall website (as archived on 3 March 2016) (in French)

Marrakesh
Public transport in Morocco
Marrakesh
Bus rapid transit